The  was a six-person tag team title in the Japanese professional wrestling promotion Dramatic Dream Team, today known as DDT Pro-Wrestling. The title, established in 2003, was named after the Jiyūgaoka neighborhood in Meguro. It has since been essentially replaced by the KO-D 6-Man Tag Team Championship.

Title history

Combined reigns

By team

By wrestler

Footnotes

See also

Professional wrestling in Japan

References

DDT Pro-Wrestling championships
Trios wrestling tag team championships